Jean-Jacques de Peyret-Chappuis, called Jean-Jacques Etchevery (1916, Paris – 12 April 1997) was a 20th-century French dancer and choreographer.

Trained by Lydia Karpova and Nicolas Zverev, from 1940 he danced at Les Ballets de Monte Carlo. In 1945, he founded his own company "L'Oiseau bleu". In 1946, Georges Hirsch called him as ballet master of the Paris Opera then entrusted him, as director of dance, to establish a new national ballet at the Opéra-Comique. After six years, he left the Opéra-Comique to become choreographer, director of ballet, stage director and finally director at the Théâtre de la Monnaie in Brussels. He signed his first mise en scène in 1956.

After three years he left that position to become a full-time stage director all over Europe and even at the Teatro Colón in Buenos Aires. He signed with the Grand Théâtre de Genève, when it reopened in 1962, where he organized the technical and administrative services and directed the stage. In 1973, he was appointed director of the  where he would stay 10 full years.

A prolific choreographer and director, he mainly drew inspiration from poetry and painting.

Some creations 
 1945: La Bourrée fantasque
 1947: Khamma, by Claude Debussy
 1949: Casse-Noisette
 1951: La Chanson du mal-aimé (text by Guillaume Apollinaire, music by Léo Ferré)
 1953: Pelléas et Mélisande (music by Gabriel Fauré)
 1954: Les Bals de Paris
 1955: Opéras-Ballets
 1956: Manet
 1956: Le Masque de la mort rouge, by Léon Jongen
 1957: Pygmalion
 1958: Mephisto-Valse (music by Franz Liszt)

External links 
 Jean-Jacques Etchevery on data.bnf.fr
 La jeune fille en bleu: Pétersbourg-Berlin-Paris
 La vie culturelle à Bordeaux 1945-1975

French male ballet dancers
French choreographers
French ballet masters
Artists from Paris
1916 births
1997 deaths